Richman as a surname may refer to:

 Adam Richman (born 1974), host of the Travel Channel's Man v. Food
 Adam Richman (singer) (born ca. 1983), American indie pop singer-songwriter
 Alfred A. Richman (c. 1892 - December 8, 1984), orthopedic surgeon
 Boomie Richman (1921–2016), American saxophone player
 Caryn Richman (born 1956), American actress
 Chaim Richman, rabbi in Israel
 Charles Richman (commissioner), American community affairs worker
 Charles Richman (actor) (1865–1940), American film actor
 David Richman (born 1978), American basketball head coach
 Douglas Richman (born 1943), American medical virologist
 Frank Richman (1881–1956), Justice of the Indiana Supreme Court
 Harry Richman (1895–1972), American entertainer
 Ike Richman (1913–1965), American attorney and sports executive)
 Jeffrey Richman, American writer, producer and actor
 John Henry Richman (1791–1864), South Australian lawyer
 Jonathan Richman (born 1951), American indie musician
 Josh Richman (born 1965), American actor and director
 Keith Richman, American politician from California
 Larry L. Richman (born 1955), American author on project management and social media strategist
 Peter Mark Richman (1927–2021), American actor
 Simon Richman (b. 1990), English footballer
Richman may also refer to:
 Richman, a computer board game series published by Softstar Entertainment

See also
 Reichmann
 Richmond (surname)

Jewish surnames